FC Forte Taganrog is a Russian football team based in Taganrog. For 2020–21 season, it received the license for the third-tier Russian Professional Football League.

Current squad
As of 30 January 2023, according to the Second League website.

References

Association football clubs established in 2020
Football clubs in Russia
Sport in Taganrog
2020 establishments in Russia